The 1946–47 season was Fussball Club Basel 1893's Fifty-fourth season in their existence. It was their first season in the top flight of Swiss football after their promotion from the Nationalliga B the season before. They played their home games in the Landhof, in the Quarter Kleinbasel. Jules Düblin was the club's new chairman and he took over this position from Emil Junkerat the club's AGM. Düblin had been player for FC Basel in the years 1919–1926 and had been on the club's board of directors. He was doctor, banker and politician, became author and private art collector.

Overview 
After his playing career the Austrian ex-international Anton Schall, who suffered from a rare heart condition, moved to Switzerland and took over Basel as club trainer for the 1946–47 season. Basel played a total of 39 games in this season. Of these 26 in the Nationalliga A, six in the Swiss Cup and seven were test games. The test games resulted with three victories, three draws and one defeat. In total, they won 21 games, drew eight and lost 10 times. In total, including the test games and the cup competition, they scored 111 goals and conceded 65.

There were fourteen teams contesting in the 1946–47 Nationalliga A, the bottom two teams in the table to be relegated. Basel finished their season in fourth position in the table, with twelve victories from 26 games, scoring in total 60 goals. Traugott Oberer was the team's top goal scorer. René Bader and Hermann Suter were joint second best, each with 10 goals. FC Biel-Bienne won the championship. Young Boys and ended the season on the relegation places.

In the Swiss Cup Basel started in round 3 with a home match against local team Black Stars Basel, the game was won 3– 2. In round 4 they had an away tie against La Chaux-de-Fonds which was won 2–1. Round 5 gave Basel another home tie in the Landhof against another local club Nordstern and this ended with a 6–1 victory. Thus they advanced to the quarter-finals and were matched against the Grasshoppers. The Grasshoppers were beaten 2–1. In the semi-final goals from top scorers Traugott Oberer and René Bader gave Basel a 2–1 victory against Grenchen. Therefore, Basel advanced to the Cup-Final, which was played in the Stadion Neufeld in Bern on 7 April 1947. Basel won the final 3–0 against Lausanne Sport and thus their second cup title. In the Final Paul Stöcklin scored two goals and Bader the other. Schall led Basel to win the Cup, but he died shortly afterwards at the age of 40 years during a workout on the football field. Following this unhappy event captain Ernst Hufschmid later took over as team coach.

Players

Results

Legend

Friendly matches

Pre-season

Winter break

Nationalliga

League matches

League table

Swiss Cup

See also
 History of FC Basel
 List of FC Basel players
 List of FC Basel seasons

References

Sources 
 Rotblau: Jahrbuch Saison 2014/2015. Publisher: FC Basel Marketing AG. 
 Die ersten 125 Jahre. Publisher: Josef Zindel im Friedrich Reinhardt Verlag, Basel. 
 The FCB team 1946–47 at fcb-archiv.ch
 Switzerland 1946–47 by Erik Garin at Rec.Sport.Soccer Statistics Foundation

External links
 FC Basel official site

FC Basel seasons
Basel